Gymnallabes typus is a species of airbreathing catfish found in Benin, Cameroon and Nigeria.  It occurs in the delta and the lower reaches of the Niger River as well as the Cross River. It reaches a length of 23.0 cm (9.1 inches) TL.

References 

Clariidae
Fish of Africa
Taxa named by Albert Günther
Fish described in 1867